Stylloi is a village in the Famagusta District of Cyprus, located 12 km northwest of Famagusta. It is under the de facto control of Northern Cyprus.

References

Communities in Famagusta District
Populated places in Gazimağusa District